Humen Ferry Terminal (虎门港澳码头)  is a ferry terminal in the Humen Town of Dongguan, in the Southern China's Guangdong province, situated immediately north of Hong Kong. It includes a passenger terminal for high-speed ferries connecting the Humen with Zhuhai and the Skypier at Hong Kong International Airport.

See also 
 Chu Kong Passenger Transport Co., Ltd
 Pearl River (aka Zhujiang River)

Ports and harbours of China
Ferry terminals in China